"I Want Out" is a song by English rockabilly band Matchbox featuring Kirsty MacColl. It was released in 1983 as the third and final single from the band's sixth studio album Crossed Line (1982). It was written by Brian Hodgson, Ray Peters and Tony Colton, and produced by Hodgson.

Background
"I Want Out" failed to make an appearance in the top 100 of the UK Singles Chart, but reached number 137 in the top 200 chart compiled by Gallup. It also appeared at number 86 on Record Business magazine's Top 100 Airplay chart on 31 January 1983. The song reached number 58 on the West German Singles Chart in March 1983.

To promote the single in Germany, Matchbox and MacColl performed the song on Musikladen, which was broadcast on 10 February 1983. In the UK, MacColl made an appearance at a Matchbox concert at the Venue in London in 1983. She performed "I Want Out" with the band, along with her own hit "There's a Guy Works Down the Chip Shop Swears He's Elvis".

Critical reception
On its release as a single, Smash Hits wrote, "There's not many rock 'n' roll acts who are worse than Shakin' Stevens but here's one. Nevertheless, this is saved by a real rootsy-tootsy vocal from Kirsty." Jim Reid of Record Mirror commented, "English people trying to be redneck Americans, nearly as embarrassing as Kajagoogoo's imitation of a vibrant new pop group." Mansfield and Sutton Recorder considered the song to have "a true Matchbox sound with the added magic of Kirsty MacColl, sharing the lead vocal with Graham Fenton". Frank Edmonds of the Bury Free Press gave the song a six and a half out of 10 rating and wrote, "So would I if I made a record like this! No, seriously, it's not too bad, really."

Track listing
7" single
"I Want Out" – 2:42
"Heaven Can Wait" – 3:03

Personnel
Matchbox
 Graham Fenton – lead vocals
 Dick Callan – lead guitar
 Gordon Scott – guitar
 Brian Hodgson – bass
 Jimmie Redhead – drums

Additional musicians
 Kirsty MacColl – lead vocals

Production
 Brian Hodgson – producer
 Bazza – engineer
 Dave Bellotti, Phil Vinall – assistant engineers

Charts

References

1982 songs
1983 singles
Kirsty MacColl songs
Magnet Records singles